Easley Township is an inactive township in Macon County, in the U.S. state of Missouri.

Easley Township has the name of William Easley, a local county judge.

References

Townships in Missouri
Townships in Macon County, Missouri